The 1951 Duke Blue Devils football team represented the Duke Blue Devils of Duke University during the 1951 college football season.

Schedule

References

Duke
Duke Blue Devils football seasons
Duke Blue Devils football